Down Periscope is a 1996 American military comedy submarine film directed by David S. Ward, produced by Robert Lawrence, and starring Kelsey Grammer, Lauren Holly, and Rob Schneider along with Bruce Dern, Harry Dean Stanton, William H. Macy, and Rip Torn in supporting roles. Released by 20th Century Fox on March 1, 1996, the film focuses on Lieutenant Commander Thomas Dodge (played by Grammer), a capable (if somewhat unorthodox) U.S. Navy officer who fights to save his career after being saddled with a group of misfit seamen who have been brought together as the crew of his first command, USS Stingray, a rusty, obsolete World War II-era diesel submarine that is the focus of a special naval war game, supervised by a bitter rival (played by Dern) who is fighting to bury Dodge's career by any means necessary.

Plot
Lieutenant Commander Thomas Dodge, currently the executive officer of the  attack submarine USS Orlando under its commanding officer Commander Carl Knox, is being considered for a third time to captain a submarine. He has been previously rejected because of his unorthodox command methods that include a "brushing" incident with a Russian submarine near the port of Murmansk, Russia, and a genital tattoo reading "Welcome Aboard" that he acquired afterward while drunk on shore leave. If denied again, he will be dismissed from the Navy's submarine command program.

Rear Admiral Yancy Graham, who dislikes Dodge, opposes his promotion, but Vice Admiral Dean Winslow, Commander, Submarine Force Atlantic, who likes Dodge and his methods, selects him to participate in a war game to test the Navy's defenses against attack from diesel-powered submarines. As Russia has been selling off their diesel fleet to America's adversaries, Winslow orders him to restore the rusty World War II-era  diesel-powered submarine USS Stingray, assigned to him by Graham, and use it to "invade" Charleston Harbor undetected, and if successful, to sink a dummy warship in Norfolk Harbor with two live torpedoes. Though initially reluctant to participate, Dodge offers Winslow a wager: if he successfully completes both tasks, Winslow will give him a nuclear submarine to command. Winslow agrees to consider it, instructing him to "think like a pirate" during the exercise.

Graham, boasting that he has never lost a war game and motivated by his own ambition to obtain a third star, handpicks "the crew from hell" for Stingray: hot-tempered, uptight Lieutenant Martin G. Pascal as the executive officer; crusty civilian naval contractor Howard as the Chief Engineer; rebellious Engineman 1st Class Brad Stepanak; ultra-sharp-eared Sonar Technician 2nd Class E.T. "Sonar" Lovacelli; compulsive gambler Seaman Stanley "Spots" Sylvesterson; former losing college basketball player Seaman Jefferson "Stoneball" Jackson; shock-prone (and shock-addled) Electrician's Mate Michael Nitro; and not-so-Culinary Specialist Second Class Buckman as Stingrays cook. Additionally, Graham assigns Lieutenant Emily Lake as Stingrays Diving Officer, part of a "special program" to see if women can successfully serve aboard submarines.

Using a storm off the Carolina coast as a diversion, Dodge and his crew offset their technological disadvantage by disguising the Stingray as a fishing trawler to infiltrate Charleston Harbor and set off signal flares. Upset at losing the first part of the war game and desperate to defeat Dodge, Graham halves the game's containment area without Winslow's authorization. Running into trouble on their first attempt at Norfolk Harbor, Dodge leaves the containment area and heads out to sea, breaking all contact with the Navy. Irate at this lapse in protocol, Pascal openly accuses him of hijacking his own boat and attempts to usurp him. Stingrays crew, weary of Pascal's berating and harassment, turn against him, and Dodge charges him with attempted mutiny. On deck, Lake witnesses Dodge and the crew, wearing makeshift buccaneer outfits and speaking like pirates, commit a mock execution by making a blindfolded Pascal walk the plank into the raised net of a waiting fishing trawler that will take him ashore.

During the Stingrays second attempt at Norfolk, Graham, hellbent on stopping Dodge, assumes command of the Orlando from Knox. Dodge employs an incredibly dangerous maneuver: passing Stingray between the huge propellers of a commercial supertanker to avoid sonar detection by the naval ships and aircraft protecting the approach to Norfolk. By the time Orlando eventually locates, pursues, and targets the Stingray, Dodge has fired two live torpedoes at  into a target ship anchored in Norfolk Harbor, thereby humiliating Graham and winning the war game. 

After Dodge's crew returns to port, Winslow chastises Graham and denies his promotion for attempting to undermine Dodge's success. He then congratulates Dodge, informing him that he will now be given command of a new , along with a proper crew to man her. Dodge respectfully requests that his entire Stingray crew be transferred with him, to which Winslow agrees, also revealing that Stepanak is his son, despite having his mother's surname. After Dodge dismisses his crew to begin a well-earned shore leave, Lake casually asks him as both of them leave the dock, "What exactly is this tattoo I keep hearing about?".

Cast
Kelsey Grammer as Lieutenant Commander Thomas "Tom" Dodge, Commanding Officer, USS Stingray (formerly Executive Officer, USS Orlando) 
Lauren Holly as Lieutenant Emily Lake, Diving Officer, USS Stingray
Rob Schneider as Lieutenant Martin G. "Marty" Pascal, Executive Officer, USS Stingray
Harry Dean Stanton as Howard, Stingrays Chief Engineer
Rip Torn as Vice Admiral Dean Winslow, Commander, Submarine Force Atlantic (COMSUBLANT)
Bruce Dern as Rear Admiral Yancy Graham, Blue Team leader of the war game
William H. Macy as Commander Carl Knox, Commanding Officer, USS Orlando 
Ken Hudson Campbell as Culinary Specialist 2nd Class Buckman, Stingrays Cook 
Toby Huss as Electrician's Mate Michael "Mike" Nitro, Electrician of USS Stingray
Duane Martin as Seaman Jefferson "Stoneball" Jackson, Planesman 
Jonathan Penner as Seaman Stanley "Spots" Sylvesterson, Helmsman
Bradford Tatum as Engineman 1st Class Bradley "Brad" Stepanak, Stingrays leading engineman and Admiral Winslow's son
Harland Williams as Sonar Technician 2nd Class E.T. 'Sonar" Lovacelli
Patton Oswalt as Stingray Radioman

Production notes
The name of the film is a play on the title of the 1959 World War II drama Up Periscope and spoofs several titles in the submarine film subgenre, including the Cold War drama The Hunt for Red October.

Down Periscope began shooting on May 6, 1995, and finished on July 27.

, a Balao-class submarine from World War II, now a museum ship and memorial in San Francisco, played the part of USS Stingray. The nearby Suisun Bay Reserve Fleet stood in for Naval Station Norfolk.

The film makes use of both standard US Navy stock footage and scenes shot specifically for the film. Fletcher was one of the most decorated ships in US Navy history. Over the closing credits, a music video is shown of the Village People and the film's cast performing "In the Navy" aboard Stingray.

Release
Down Periscope had its US theatrical release on March 1, 1996. The film grossed $25,785,603 domestically and $37,553,752 worldwide.  The film was released on home video five months later, on August 6, 1996.

Reception 
On the review aggregator website Rotten Tomatoes, the film has a score of 11% from 35 reviews, with an average rating 4.1/10. The site's consensus states: "Down Periscope takes audiences on an aimless voyage for aquatic hijinks, proving there really aren't any effective sub-stitutes for a well-written script." On Metacritic, the film receive a score of 39 based on 18 reviews, indicating "generally unfavorable reviews".

Variety wrote, "The makers of Police Academy and Major League team up to take on the submarine corps [...] and the result is a testosterone comedy that’s crude fun, with a pinch of corn-pone morality. It’s good-natured, innocuous frivolity that should raise a few smiles..." However, Stephen Holden of The New York Times felt, "The tone of the acting, which is set by Mr. Grammer's blandly laid-back performance, is all wrong for a genre that demands over-the-top hamming". Holden also wrote that the film does manage to provide "a couple of amusing bits", but "The energy level of Down Periscope is so low that moments like these, which should flare hilariously, reach a wan flicker".

See also

 Operation Petticoat (1959)

References

External links
 
 
 
 
 
 
 

1990s American films
1990s English-language films
1996 comedy films
1996 films
20th Century Fox films
American comedy films
films about the United States Navy
films directed by David S. Ward
films scored by Randy Edelman
films with screenplays by Hugh Wilson
military humor in film
submarine films